is a military aerodrome of the Japan Ground Self-Defense Force (JGSDF). It is located at JGSDF , in Yoshinogari, Saga Prefecture, Japan.

On February 5, 2018 an AH-64D Apache of the JGSDF helicopter based at Metabaru crashed in nearby Kanzaki, Saga. Both crew members were killed in the crash, a local person was injured and a house was destroyed.

References

Japanese airbases
Transport in Saga Prefecture
Japan Ground Self-Defense Force bases
Buildings and structures in Saga Prefecture